The 2024 London mayoral election will be held on 2 May 2024 to elect the mayor of London, England. The election will take place the same day as elections to the London Assembly, as well as local elections across England and Wales. Labour Party incumbent Sadiq Khan is running for re-election to a third term in office.

Background

Political context 
First elected in 2016, Sadiq Khan of the Labour Party won a second term in office in the 2021 election. As the previous contest was initially scheduled for 2020 before being delayed by the COVID-19 pandemic, Khan's current term only covers a three-year period. Khan has indicated that he plans to stand again for a third term in 2024. 

Polling in January 2022 found that 48% thought he was doing badly as mayor and 38% thought he was doing well. This gave him a net approval rating of -10%, the first time approval polling has been negative for Khan since he took office as mayor.

Electoral system 
Under the Elections Act 2022, in contrast to the supplementary vote system used in previous mayoral elections, the 2024 election will be held under a first past the post system: the candidate receiving the highest number of votes will be elected mayor, even if they do not receive an overall majority. In January 2022, a report to the London Assembly also recommended that ballots be counted by hand, rather than electronically as at previous elections.

Candidates

Labour Party 
There was media speculation in 2021 as to whether Sadiq Khan would stand for a third term as mayor or instead stand for leader of the Labour Party in a future contest. Khan confirmed that he would stand again for a third term as mayor and had no interest in seeking the leadership of his party. David Lammy, the MP for Tottenham and shadow foreign secretary, had been mentioned as a possible Labour candidate should Khan not seek another term. Lammy previously stood for the mayoralty in the 2016 election. John Bercow, a former speaker of the House of Commons, was also mentioned as a possible contender. It was officially announced on 20 December 2022 that Khan had been reselected as Labour's mayoral candidate. This was following a vote of Labour members and Labour's affiliate unions to re-endorse him rather than to open up the selection process.

Conservative Party

Declared 
 Andrew Boff, Deputy Chair of the London Assembly and perennial candidate for mayor
 Samuel Kasumu, former special adviser to then-Prime Minister Boris Johnson

Publicly expressed interest 
 Nick Rogers, member of the London Assembly since 2021
 Paul Scully, Minister for London and MP for Sutton and Cheam

Potential 
 Shaun Bailey, member of the London Assembly since 2016 and nominee for mayor in 2021
 Sajid Javid, MP for Bromsgrove, former Chancellor of the Exchequer, and former Home Secretary

Green Party

Nominated 
 Zoë Garbett, Hackney borough councillor and nominee for mayor of Hackney in 2022

Lost nomination 
 Scott Ainslie, Lambeth borough councillor and former MEP for London
 Benali Hamdache, Islington borough councillor

Declined 
Siân Berry, member of the London Assembly since 2016, former co-leader of the Green Party, and nominee for mayor in 2008, 2016, and 2021 (endorsed Garbett)

Endorsements

Results

Independents

Publicly expressed interest 
 Count Binface, satirical candidate

Potential 
 Jeremy Corbyn, MP for Islington North and former leader of the Labour Party

Results

Notes

References

2024
Future elections in the United Kingdom
London